Harpalus major is a species of ground beetle in the subfamily Harpalinae. It was described by Victor Motschulsky in 1850.

References

major
Beetles described in 1850